A hat-trick in cricket is when a bowler takes three wickets from consecutive deliveries. It is a relatively rare feat, and has occurred 28 times in the history of women's international cricket. The first hat-trick was taken in a Test match between Australia and England in February 1958, by Australia's Betty Wilson. Two further hat-tricks have been taken in women's Tests; by Pakistan's Shaiza Khan in 2004, and Australia's Rene Farrell in 2011. The first hat-trick in women's One Day Internationals was taken by Carole Hodges during the 1993 Women's Cricket World Cup.

In September 2019, against the West Indies, Megan Schutt became the first female bowler to take two hat-tricks in international cricket.

The most recent bowler to achieve the feat was Australia's Heather Graham, against India during a Women's Twenty20 International (WT20I) in December 2022.

Key

Hat-tricks

Tests

One Day Internationals

1 Dane van Niekerk took 4 wickets in 5 balls during this spell. She dismissed Shemaine Campbelle (st †Trisha Chetty) and bowled a dot ball before she took the hat-trick.

Twenty20 Internationals

As of March 2022, 23 hat-tricks have been taken in over 1,000 WT20I matches.

See also
 List of Test cricket hat-tricks
 List of One Day International cricket hat-tricks

Notes

References

hat
Women international cricketers
International cricket records and statistics
Hat-trick takers
hat-trick